Tarik Hodžić (born 16 October 1972) is a Bosnian table tennis player. He competed in the men's singles event at the 1996 Summer Olympics.

References

External links
 

1972 births
Living people
Bosnia and Herzegovina male table tennis players
Olympic table tennis players of Bosnia and Herzegovina
Table tennis players at the 1996 Summer Olympics
Place of birth missing (living people)